Rīgas Satiksme is a municipally-owned public transportation and infrastructure company serving Riga, Latvia and the surrounding areas. It was founded on 20 February 2003 as an umbrella organisation for the respective operators of trams, buses and trolleybuses in the city of Riga. Two years later, the separate operators of the different modes of public transport were merged and re-branded to its current name.

Along with public transport services, Rīgas Satiksme also administers paid parking services throughout the city. It currently employs roughly 4,100 staff and its passengers completed 146.8 million rides in 2015. In 2018 the debt of Rīgas Satiksme reached nearly 300 million.

Structure 

The company PLC "Rīgas satiksme" was founded on February 20, 2003, by merging the bus fleets "Imanta" and "Tālava". In January 2005, four PLCs of the Riga Municipality were merged — "Rīgas satiksme" (bus service), "Tramvaju un trolejbusu pārvalde" (electric transport), "Rīgas autostāvvietas" (car parks) and "Rīgas domes autobāze" (Riga City Council car depot). As a result, "Rīgas satiksme" has become the largest enterprise of the city government, employing 6,500 people.

The company is a member of the Latvian Association of Latvian Passengers, the Latvian Quality Association and the Latvian Association of Auto-Engineering.

Until December 12, 2018, Leons Bemhens was the chairman of the Board of the enterprise. From December 13, 2018, the acting manager of the enterprise was Anrijs Matīss (until early 2019), who was replaced by Ernests Saulītis, with Ernests Ozols being elected for a full five-year term on 1 February 2022.

The fare, when buying a ticket from the driver, is €2. When paying using an e-ticket (E-talons), the fare is reduced (depending on the type of ticket) to €1,15.

3 types of e-ticket are available:

 Personalised e-ticket

A plastic card with a microchip that confirms its belonging to a particular passenger. This is a card with a photo, first and last name.

 Unpersonalised E-ticket

A plastic card with a microchip without confirming the identity of a particular passenger. It is possible to purchase such a card and replenish it as needed.

 Yellow E-ticket

Cardboard ticket with a microchip for a certain time or number of trips. The cardboard ticket is valid for three months from the date of purchase.

History 
The first electric tram began operating on the streets of Riga on July 11 (24), 1901. It replaced the horse-drawn carriage service that had been started in the autumn of 1882.

The first buses appeared in Riga in 1913, but before the First World War they had no significant transport value. The progenitor of this type of transport is a horse-drawn omnibus, which made the first trip in 1852.

The first trolley bus was introduced at the beginning of 1947 on the experimental route "Air Bridge — Brasa Station", and on November 4, 1947, a regular trolleybus service was opened on the "Viesturdārzs – Ģertrūdes street". In 1973 in Riga, the invention of Kyiv native Volodymyr Veklych  - the trolleybus train -  was successfully implemented. It consisted of two units of Škoda 9TR trolley buses, interconnected by Volodymyr Veklych's system. The maximum number of trains in operation were used between 1984 and 1987.

Although Riga is the largest of the capitals of the Scandinavian and Baltic countries (counting without agglomeration), it was not destined to have its own subway, unlike almost all other cities millionaires of the USSR. The Riga Metro was planned to be constructed beginning from 1990, the commissioning of the first starting section of 8 stations was scheduled for 2000—2002, but the creation was canceled due to the public protests and the collapse of the USSR.

Buses

Bus routes

Current fleet

Trolleybuses
The first trolleybuses in Riga entered service in 1947, using a portion of the budget initially set aside for the new tramway, with the intention of moving slightly slower trams away from the city centre to allow for faster trolleybuses. The service was operated initially by Soviet-built units, although these were later replaced by Škoda vehicles brought in from Czechoslovakia. Conductors remained on trolleybuses for five years after they disappeared from the buses, with electric ticket machines replacing them in 1975. Conductors were re-introduced on the trolleybus network in 1997 and remained until 2007 when new electronic ticket machines were installed. These were in turn replaced in 2009 with e-tickets (e-talons).

Trolleybus routes

Current fleet

Trams

Trams have been in operation in Riga longer than any other mode of public transport, with the first horse-drawn trams entering service in 1882. In 1900, it was agreed that a number of electric tram lines would be built in the city, with the first electric trams starting operation in 1901. Tram construction continued until the outbreak of World War I. Operation of the tramways remained largely unchanged until 1918 and the emergence for the first time of Latvia as an independent nation, when a Belgian company took over. This period of private ownership was deemed a failure, and the city authorities regained control of the tram network in 1931. World War II devastated Riga's public transport system, and it was gradually rebuilt to its current level.

In 2002, Rīgas Vagonbūves Rūpnīca signed an agreement with the Mayor of Riga which would see the company replace the trams in Riga once their period of operation ended in 2010. The new trams would have offered enhanced comfort and safety, as well as would be far quieter than the city's current fleet of elderly ČKD Tatra units. According to RVR, they would have featured bright and spacious interiors and would have been 20-30% more power-efficient than their predecessors. The new units were expected to be produced at a rate of 15-20 per year and would have resulted in a gradual phasing out of the Tatra tramcars.

These plans were not fully exercised; instead, in 2008, Škoda built 20 three-section 15 T trams for Riga, the first of which entered service in spring 2010. An option for 4 four-section trams of the same model was taken and these entered service in 2012. A further 15 three-section trams and 5 four-section trams were ordered in 2016, the first of which was delivered in April 2018.

Tram lines

Network map

Current fleet

Fares

A flat fare (applies from 1 February 2015) of 1.15 EUR per single journey (2.00 EUR, if bought from the driver) applies on all Rīgas Satiksme bus, tram and trolleybus services within the city boundaries. Fares on the regional bus routes vary depending on the journey destination.

Fare collection on public transport in Riga used conductors until 2008.

Scandals 

In early 2013 former advisor on transport affairs for Mayor of Riga and Rīgas Satiksme council deputy chairman Leonards Tenis was charged with repeated bribe-taking in large amounts in the so-called Daimler bribery affair, where Daimler bribed Tenis and various other Riga City Council officials to secure winning the public transportation purchase tenders between 2002 and 2006.

In 2013 police detained an employee of Rīgas Satiksme on the suspicion that he had raped multiple underage girls and filmed pornographic scenes with them, as well as coerced approximately 200 underage girls via social networking websites. He was accused of committing 42 sexual crimes against 20 underage girls from 2009 to 2013. In May 2015 another employee of Rīgas Satiksme was detained for gathering pornographic material of underage boys.

On 1 February 2015 the analytical news program "Nothing Personal" reported that Rīgas Satiksme may be involved in a fraud scheme related to the company's procurement of detergents and other cleaning aids in 2013 and 2014, when plain water was supplied instead of the ordered nanotechnological detergents. In response to the report, Rīgas Satiksme set up a disciplinary investigative commission that performed an inquiry and reported not finding any violations in the procurement process.

On 14 December 2017 four people were charged in what became infamously known as the "nanotechnology case" for a large-scale fraud causing 700 000 EUR loss to the company. Among them was an official who was accused of "improper use of the service for gracious purposes, which has had serious consequences", while criminal proceedings had been initiated against two more officers, but Rīgas Satiksme was recognised as a victim in the case. On 4 July 2018 the public prosecutor issued a warning to Riga City Council and Rīgas Satiksme for the procurement procedure of nanotechnology chemicals not complying with the requirements of the law.

On 1 October 2018 police searched the offices of Rīgas Satiksme in relation to a launched criminal investigation over suspected large-scale fraud in the company. Two days later the prosecutor's office confirmed that the searches were a part of a separate criminal case derived from the "nanotechnology case".

On 11 December Corruption Prevention and Combating Bureau carried out more than 30 searches in the offices of Rīgas Satiksme and the Rīga City Council and detained 6 people in Latvia, including Rīga Satiksme Infrastructure Maintenance and Development Department director Igors Volkinšteins and businessman Māris Martinsons and 2 in Poland in cooperation with the Poland's Central Anti-Corruption Bureau. Two days later Riga Vidzeme District Court arrested 3 more people – Škoda Transportation Sales Area Director Vladislav Kozák, Honor to serve Riga party member and one of largest Harmony donors Aleksandrs Krjačeks and Edgars Teterovskis. The same day the board of Rīgas Satiksme resigned. Mayor of Riga Nils Ušakovs suspended the head of Rīgas Satiksme, Leonīds Bemhens and appointed a temporary board, led by Anrijs Matīss. The next day Bemhens was detained by the Corruption Prevention and Combating Bureau. On 17 December deputy mayor of Riga Andris Ameriks announced his resignation.

On 28 February Pūce demanded Ušakovs to provide a detailed overview for the state of Rīgas Satiksmes' financial affairs and planned steps to stabilize the situation in the company after the interim chairperson of Rīgas Satiksme Anrijs Matīss announced the same day that the company would need 37 million euros in March to avoid insolvency. On 5 March Matīss resigned due to lack of support for changes in the company from Ušakovs and was replaced by Ernests Saulītis. On 8 March Corruption Prevention and Combating Bureau detained a member of the Honor to Serve Riga, board member of Rīgas Karte and an official of Rīgas Satiksme Aleksandrs Brandavs on suspicion of bribery.

See also
Pasažieru vilciens (Commuter rail & national passenger rail)
Riga International Coach Terminal

References

External links
 Official website 
Official website 

Bus companies of Latvia
Tram transport in Latvia
Trolleybus systems by city
Trolleybus transport in Latvia
Transport in Riga
Companies based in Riga
2003 establishments in Latvia